Derek Gustafson (born June 21, 1979) is an American former professional ice hockey goaltender. He played 5 games in the National Hockey League between 2001 and 2002 for the Minnesota Wild. The rest of his career, which lasted from 2000 to 2008, was spent in different minor leagues.

Playing career
Prior to beginning his professional career, Gustafson was a goaltender for the St. Lawrence University Skating Saints during the 1999-2000 season.  This was the third best season in Skating Saints history, and, with Gustafson as the starting goaltender, the team finished at the top of the ECACHL regular season standings, won the ECACHL tournament, and advanced to the NCAA Division I semifinals after defeating Boston University 3-2 in quadruple overtime.  This game is the longest game played in the history of the NCAA tournament and is the third longest Men's Division I game. Gustafson and BU netminder, Rick DiPietro both hold the record for most saves in a game.

Career statistics

Regular season and playoffs

Awards and honors

References

External links

1979 births
Living people
Adirondack Frostbite players
Alaska Aces (ECHL) players
American men's ice hockey goaltenders
Cleveland Lumberjacks players
Houston Aeros (1994–2013) players
Ice hockey people from Oregon
Jackson Bandits players
Louisiana IceGators (ECHL) players
Minnesota Wild players
Sportspeople from Gresham, Oregon
Providence Bruins players
St. Lawrence Saints men's ice hockey players
Undrafted National Hockey League players
Vernon Vipers players